Silent Violence may refer to:

Silent Violence, 1983 book by Michael Watts
"Silent Violence", song from Haunted (Six Feet Under album)
"Silent Violence", song by Sepultura Machine Messiah (album)

See also
Duwana Muwan (A silent violence) (Sinhalese: දුවන මුවන්)   2014 Sri Lankan Sinhala children's film directed by Indra Weerasekara